Mariana van Zeller (born May 7, 1976) is a Peabody Award-winning Portuguese journalist and correspondent for National Geographic Channel. She is also chief correspondent for Fusion and is a former correspondent for the Vanguard documentary series on the former Current TV.

Biography
Born on May 7, 1976, in Cascais, Portugal, van Zeller studied international relations at the Universidade Lusíada de Lisboa. After graduation, she says she spent two years working at SIC, which was at that time the first and largest Portuguese private television network. She began working in the travel and international departments of the main networks channel and later joined SIC Notícias, the network's news channel.

She applied for a master's degree at Columbia University Graduate School of Journalism three times: her first application was rejected, and her second was wait-listed. According to van Zeller herself, after her third application, in 2001, she flew to New York City and knocked on the dean's door, explaining her dream of becoming a journalist in the United States. The dean was impressed, according to her, and allowed her to enroll.

One month after she moved to New York City, the September 11 attacks took place. She was contacted that morning by a producer from SIC Notícias, where she had previously interned, and was directed to meet a news crew atop the CBS Building in Midtown Manhattan, where she would go live in three hours. Before going on air, she was told, "Prepare yourself. The whole of Portugal is watching you."

After receiving her degree from Columbia, van Zeller moved to London to work for a documentary producer, with hopes of covering the Iraq War. With London as her new base, she studied Arabic at Damascus University in Syria in order to better seek out stories in the Middle East. Over the next two years, her freelance documentaries from Syria appeared on PBS's Frontline/World, the CBC, and Channel 4 (United Kingdom). In 2005, she joined Current TV as a correspondent and producer for the Vanguard documentary series.

Van Zeller claims fluency in Portuguese, English, Spanish, Italian, and French. She also speaks some Arabic.

Personal life
Van Zeller is married to her former Columbia classmate Darren Foster, who is a series producer and director with National Geographic Channel. In July 2010, she gave birth to their child, a son named Vasco.

She became an American citizen on March 17, 2015.

Filmography

 Vanguard (2008–2013)
 Narco Bling (2012)
 Obama's Army
 El Chapo: CEO of Crime (2013)
 Inside: Secret America (2013), also known as Undercover USA
 Pimp City: A Journey to the Center of the Sex Slave Trade (2014)
 Trafficked (2020–2023)

Awards

"The OxyContin Express" also received the 2010 Television Academy Honor, a Prism Award and an Emmy nomination.

References

External links
 National Geographic profile

1976 births
Living people
Columbia University Graduate School of Journalism alumni
People from Cascais
Portuguese journalists
Portuguese people of Dutch descent
Portuguese people of French descent
Portuguese people of German descent
Current TV people
National Geographic Society
Peabody Award winners
Livingston Award winners for National Reporting